Sansibia is a genus of soft corals in the family Xeniidae.

Species
The World Register of Marine Species lists the following species:

Sansibia boquetei (Roxas, 1933)
Sansibia flava (May, 1899)
Sansibia formosana (Utinomi, 1950)
Sansibia lineata (Stimpson, 1855)

References

Xeniidae
Octocorallia genera